List of all the United States Supreme Court cases from volume 403 of the United States Reports:

External links

1971 in United States case law